Cinnoline is an aromatic heterocyclic compound with the formula C8H6N2.  It is isomeric with other naphthyridines including quinoxaline, phthalazine and quinazoline.

Properties
The free base can be obtained as an oil by treatment of the hydrochloride with base.  It co-crystallizes with one molecule of ether as white silky needles, (m.p. 24–25 °C) upon cooling ethereal solutions. The free base melts at 39 °C. It has a taste resembling that of chloral hydrate and leaves a sharp irritation for some time. Cinnoline derivatives are obtained from oxycinnoline carboxylic acid, which is formed by digesting orthophenyl propiolic acid diazo chloride with water. Oxycinnoline carboxylic acid on heating gives oxycinnoline, melting at 225 °C, which with phosphorus pentachloride gives chlorcinnoline. This substance is reduced by iron filings and sulfuric acid to dihydrocinnoline.

Discovery and synthesis
The compound was first obtained in impure form by cyclization of the alkyne o-C6H4(NH2)C≡CCO2H in water to give 4-hydroxycinnoline-3-carboxylic acid.  This material could be decarboxylated and the hydroxyl group reductively removed to give the parent heterocycle. This reaction is called the Richter cinnoline synthesis.  Improved methods exist for its synthesis.  It can be prepared by dehydrogenation of dihydrocinnoline with freshly precipitated mercuric oxide.  It can be isolated as the hydrochloride.

Cinnolines are cinnoline derivatives. A classic organic reaction for synthesizing cinnolines is the Widman–Stoermer synthesis, a ring-closing reaction of an α-vinyl- aniline with hydrochloric acid and sodium nitrite:

The sodium nitrite is first converted to nitrous acid which then forms the electrophilic intermediate dinitrogen trioxide. The next intermediate is the stable nitrosamine with goes on to lose water forming the diazonium salt which then reacts with the vinyl group in the ring-closing step. A conceptually related reaction is the Bamberger triazine synthesis towards triazines.

Another cinnoline method is the Borsche cinnoline synthesis.

Safety
Cinnoline is toxic.

See also
 Benzo[c]cinnoline

References

Aromatic bases